Pir Emam (also Romanized as Pīr Emām and Pīremām) is a village in Zaz-e Sharqi Rural District, Zaz va Mahru District, Aligudarz County, Lorestan Province, Iran. At the 2006 census, its population was 503, in 95 families, making it the most populous village in the rural district and in Zaz va Mahru District.

References 

Towns and villages in Aligudarz County